New Market is an unincorporated community in Clark County, Indiana, in the United States.

History
New Market was originally called Oregon, and under the latter name was established in 1839. A post office called Oregon operated from 1846 until 1910.

References

Unincorporated communities in Clark County, Indiana
1839 establishments in Indiana
Unincorporated communities in Indiana
Populated places established in 1839